Dun-sur-Auron (literally Dun on Auron) is a commune  in the Cher department in the Centre-Val de Loire region of France.

Geography
Another small river, the Airain flows northwest through the northern part of the commune.

Population

History 
Dun-sur-Auron dates back from Dunum, a Gaul fortified place. In the Middle Ages it depended from the Viscount of Bourges. In 1101, the last viscount, Eudes Arpin, lord of Dun, sold his estates to King Philip I of France and the city was renamed Dun-le-Roi.

Sights
The sixteenth-century town walls
 The twelfth-century church of St. Etienne.
 Fifteenth-century houses.
 A feudal motte castle.
The chateau of La Périsse.
 The belltower.
 A museum.

Personalities
Maurice Bardèche (1907–1998), journalist and writer.
Érick Jacquin (1964-Present), chef and TV personality.

See also
Communes of the Cher department

References

External links

Official town website 

Communes of Cher (department)
Berry, France